The 2016 Pan American Fencing Championships were being held at the Convention Center Vasco Nuñez de Balboa in Panama City from 21 to 26 June 2016. The event was organized by the Pan American Fencing Confederation and the National Fencing Association of Panama.

Medal summary

Men's events

Women's events

Medal table

References

External links 
 Invitation to the competition
  Programme, National Fencing Association of Panama

2016
Pan American Fencing Championships
2016 in Panamanian sport
International sports competitions hosted by Panama
Fencing in Panama
Pan American Fencing Championships